This is a list of motorways and expressways in New Zealand, including some proposed and under construction. There are currently 406 km of motorways and expressways in New Zealand. 68 km are currently under construction, with a further 60 km expected to be completed by 2029, at which time a total of 516 km of motorway and expressway is expected.

Expressways in New Zealand are high standard all-purpose roads, usually dual carriageway, mainly for through traffic with no restrictions. Intersections may be controlled at-grade with roundabouts or traffic signals, or fully grade separated.

Motorways in New Zealand are dual carriageway roads designed for efficient high volume motor vehicle traffic. They have a no stopping restriction and are closed to pedestrian, cycle and animal traffic. Intersections are grade-separated.

Summary

Under construction

Approved

Auckland

Northern Motorway (SH 1) 

From the Central Motorway Junction in downtown Auckland via the Auckland Harbour Bridge and the North Shore to Puhoi. 
Construction of the next section to just north of Warkworth has commenced in 2017.

Northwestern Motorway (SH 16) 

From Ports of Auckland to Brigham Creek Rd, Whenuapai.

Southwestern Motorway (SH 20) 

From the Southern Motorway in Manukau City to the Northwestern Motorway at Waterview.

Southern Motorway (SH 1) 

From downtown Auckland via Manukau City to the Bombay Hills and terminating onto the Waikato Expressway.

Upper Harbour Motorway (SH 18) 

Connecting the Northwestern and Northern Motorways via the Upper Harbour Bridge. Construction of the Northern Corridor connection between the Northern and Upper Harbour Motorways commenced in 2018, with the full interchange opening in 2022.

Waikato

Waikato Expressway (SH 1) 

An expressway between the Southern Motorway at Bombay and Cambridge, By 2007   between Longswamp and Rangiriri was three lanes with a median barrier. In 2012 the Te Rapa Spur was opened, followed by the Ngāruawāhia section in 2013. The Cambridge bypass opened on 16 December 2015, six months ahead of schedule. The route has now been fully designated, and funding was secured for the Huntly and Hamilton sections. The Huntly section opened in March 2020, but the Hamilton section was delayed due to the COVID-19 pandemic. The 15 km Cambridge Section now has a 110kmph speed limit for light vehicles as of 11 December 2017.

Bay of Plenty

Takitimu Drive (Pyes Pa - Mount Maunganui Expressway) (SH 2/SH 29) 
From Pyes Pa to Chapel Street near the city centre. An interchange exists with Tamatea Arikinui Drive, along with a "coat-hanger" interchange, which is used with Elizabeth Street and heads north towards Mt Maunganui. 
The section from Pyes Pa to the SH 2 interchange is tolled. From 1 August 2015 it was added to the New Zealand state highway network as part of SH 29.

Tamatea Arikinui Drive (Bethlehem - The Avenues Expressway) (SH 2) 
From 15th Avenue to just before Bethlehem Town Centre, with interchanges at Cambridge Road, Waihi Road and Takitimu Drive (Pyes Pa - City Expressway).

Tauranga Eastern Link (SH 2) 

Connects Tauranga to Paengaroa (with SH 33) via Papamoa, bypassing Te Puke. In late 2006 the first phase was opened from Maungatapu to Bayfair. Full motorway was completed in 2015 with the tolled section between Papamoa and Paengaroa opened to the public in August that year.
The tolled section from Papamoa to Paengaroa now has speed limit for light vehicles of 110 kmph as of 11 December 2017

Hawke's Bay

Hawke's Bay Expressway (SH 2 / SH 50)

From Hawke's Bay Airport near Napier to Pakipaki, south of Hastings.

Wellington

Johnsonville-Porirua Motorway (SH 1 / SH 59) 

Approximately  in length, this is New Zealand's first motorway; the first section opening in 1950.

Wellington Urban Motorway (SH 1) 

From Ngauranga to Te Aro,

Kapiti Expressway (SH 1) 

The Kapiti Expressway is a four-lane grade-separated expressway, stretching  from Mackays Crossing north of Paekākāriki to just north of Ōtaki on the Kapiti Coast. It carries traffic through Raumati, Paraparaumu, Waikanae and Ōtaki. The section from Mackays Crossing to Raumati South was completed in 2007 with the grade separation of the Mackays railway level crossing. Work on the Raumati to Peka Peka section started in December 2013 and opened on 24 February 2017, with minor finishing works completed by July. Construction of the section from Peka Peka north to Ōtaki commenced in late 2017 and opened in December 2022.

Transmission Gully Motorway (SH 1) 

Officially opened on 30 March 2022, from Mackays Crossing near Paekākāriki to the Johnsonville-Porirua Motorway in Linden, bypassing Centennial Highway.

Hutt Expressway (Hutt Road, Western Hutt Road, River Road) (SH 2) 

From the Wellington Urban Motorway at Ngauranga through the Hutt Valley to the Fergusson Drive intersection at Maoribank in northern Upper Hutt. It has three names: Hutt Road from Ngauranga to Petone, Western Hutt Road from Petone to Silverstream, and River Road from Silverstream to Maoribank. .

The section south of Melling is dual carriage and is fully grade separated. The section from Melling north to Silverstream is dual carriage with a mixture of at-grade and grade separated intersections. The section north of Silverstream is a 2+1 road with at grade intersections.

Canterbury

Christchurch Northern Motorway (SH 1) 

From north of Kaiapoi over the Waimakariri River through to the northern suburb of Belfast.
Its southernmost interchange (Kainga/Marshland) is unusual in that northbound traffic merges from the right, while southbound traffic is carried on a large loop to the right up and over the onramp. The reason for this design was to accommodate a future southern extension into central Christchurch, with the northbound onramp being the first part of the northbound carriageway. Northbound there are three more interchanges; Tram Road (Oxford), north off, south on; Kaiapoi (diamond interchange); and Lineside Road (  to Rangiora), north off, south on. 
It is dual carriageway from Belfast (Main North Road) to Lineside Road, single lane each way with no median strip to Woodend.

Christchurch Southern Motorway (SH 76/ SH 1) 

Short motorway bypassing a part of southern Christchurch city. Lost its status as a motorway after plans to extend the original section (between Curletts Road and Barrington Street, which was built in the early 1980s) stalled. Since 2012, the road has been extended Curletts Road to Halswell Junction Road with the original section widened to four lanes and interchanges at both Curletts Road and Barrington Street), thereby regaining motorway status. In 2020, extended to rejoin SH 1 at Templeton and continue alongside SH 1 until just west of Rolleston.

Christchurch-Lyttelton Motorway  (SH 74) 

From the intersection of Ferry and Dyers Roads along Tunnel Road through the Lyttelton Tunnel to the intersection of Norwich Quay and Simeon Quay.
It is single lane with interchanges at Bridle Path and Port Hills Road.  There is a passing lane southbound from the Port Hills Road interchange.

Western Belfast Bypass (SH 1) 

The motorway links directly from the Christchurch Northern Motorway, at Chaneys interchange, to Johns Road at the Clearwater roundabout, bypassing the current section of State Highway One through the Belfast urban area.

Otago

Former Dunedin Northern Motorway (SH 1) 
This undivided highway had its "motorway" signs removed several years ago, and is now officially called the Dunedin-Waitati Highway, although it is still referred to by Dunedinites as "the northern motorway".

It runs from Pine Hill to Waitati, and is the main route north from Dunedin.

Caversham Bypass (SH 1) 

From Dunedin CBD to Caversham, SH1 has been widened to a four-lane road over its full length. It becomes the Dunedin Southern Motorway at its western end, close to Lookout Point. At its eastern end, it joins Dunedin's central city one-way street system.

Dunedin Southern Motorway (SH 1) 

This route runs from South Dunedin to Mosgiel. It is one of the southernmost motorways in the world. The length of the motorway is 13 km.

See also 
New Zealand state highway network

References

Motorways And Expressways In New Zealand
 
Transport in Auckland